Arabic history may refer to:

Arab history, the history of the Arabic peoples
History of Arabic, the history of the Arabic language
History of Arabia, the history of the Arabian Peninsula